Mordellistena altestriatoides is a species of beetle in the genus Mordellistena of the family Mordellidae. It was discovered in 1995.

References

altestriatoides
Beetles described in 1995